Sisurcana gnosta is a species of moth of the family Tortricidae. It is found in Colombia.

The wingspan is about 19 mm. The ground colour of the forewings is cream orange, sprinkled and strigulated (finely streaked) with rust brown, but yellowish terminally. The hindwings are grey cream, but paler basally and much darker on the peripheries.

Etymology
The species name refers to the systematic position of the species and is derived from Greek gnostos (meaning possible to understand).

References

Moths described in 2010
Sisurcana
Moths of South America
Taxa named by Józef Razowski